Robert Lee "Rob" Penny (August 6, 1941 – March 16, 2003) was an American playwright, poet, social activist, and professor. Penny wrote more than 30 plays and 300 poems.

Early life
Penny was born in Opelika, Alabama, on August 6, 1941. He moved to Pittsburgh, Pennsylvania's Hill District as a toddler, where he was raised. A 1957 graduate of Central Catholic High School (Pittsburgh, Pennsylvania), Penny had childhood aspirations of joining the priesthood.

Academic life

Penny was in the first cohort of Black Studies faculty hired in 1968 by Jack L. Daniel, Ph.D. and Curtiss E. Porter, the co-directors of the University of Pittsburgh's Africana Studies Program.

Porter and Daniel sought to develop a faculty representative of both academia and community. Porter, in particular, himself a creative, drew on Penny's established reputation as a "straight ahead" poet, fusing the incantations of Bebop jazz and street lyricism into hard hitting graphic, terse poetics that spoke to street life.

Emanating from Pittsburgh's fabled Hill District creative arts core, he was a lead voice of The Centre Ave Poets Writer's Workshop, which included others such as Charlie Williams, Nick Flournoy and August Wilson, who would achieve later fame as America's premier African American playwright. Many considered Penny to be Wilson's mentor in those early days. Penny's hire, along with other non-traditionalists academics, such as the choreographer Bob Johnson were part of the push to infuse the Black Studies curriculum with a wholistic Black Aesthetic to correspond to an advanced exploration of Black academics that Porter, in particular, thought should comprise Black Studies.  After Penny began teaching at the University of Pittsburgh , he was promoted to associate professor in 1971 under the leadership of Porter.

His tenure established a foothold for the increased production of his art. Penny, moved on to serve as chair of its Africana Studies Department from 1978 to 1984 after Porter's resignation from the Chairmanship. Penny was also a founding member of the Africana Studies Department.

Theatrical contributions
In 1968, he and his friend August Wilson, a fellow Pittsburgh poet and playwright, were approached by members of Pitt's Black Action Society (Curtiss E. Porter, Tony Fountain, E. Philip McKain), who had recently obtained funding, to establish the Black Horizons Theater, which staged performances until the mid-1970s. Dr. Vernell A. Lillie founded the Kuntu Repertory Theatre in 1974 as a way of showcasing Penny's plays. Penny was the playwright-in-residence for the Kuntu Repertory Theatre. Today, the theatre continues to hold performances of Penny's plays.

In 1976, he and Wilson co-founded the Kuntu Writers Workshop, which Penny coordinated until his death on March 16, 2003.

The Pittsburgh City Council honored Penny by presenting the Penny family with a key to the City of Pittsburgh for his commitment to social activism, dedication to encouraging youth, and contributions to the greater Hill District community. July 29, 2008, is officially the city of Pittsburgh's Rob Penny Day.

The 62-year-old poet, playwright, teacher and activist died of a heart attack at his Hill District home in Pittsburgh on March 16, 2003.

Playwright credits
Penny's plays have been nationally produced in such theatres as the aforementioned Kuntu Repertory Theatre, Chicago's ETA / Creative Arts Foundation, Inc. New York's New Federal Theatre founded by Dr. Woodie King Jr. as well as Brooklyn, New York's celebrated Billie Holiday Theatre, the 2000 world premiere of Nefertari Rising was also directed by King.

Selected plays
       Among the Best: The Pittsburgh Crawfords and the Homestead Grays
	Bad News
	Blue Yonder
	Boppin' With The Ancestors
       Clean Drums
	Coon Can
	Dance of the Blues Dead
	Deeds of Blackness
	Depths of Her Star, The
	Diane's Heart Dries Out Still More
	Good Black Don't Crack
	Good Quick Feel-and Then We Build upon a Plan, A
       Killin’ and Chillin’
	Life Rise
	Little Willie Armstrong Jones
       Nefertari Rising
	Night of the Hawk
       Reflections: Rob Penny’s Forum in Flight
	Republic of New Africa, The
       Slow Lives On A Humdrum
	Sugar and Thomas
       Sun Rising on the Hill District
	Take on a Life
	Trip, A
	Uhh Survival Energy
	Up to Life
	Way, The
	Who Loves the Dancer

References

Sources

External links
  Kuntu Repertory Theatre Homepage via Internet Archive Wayback Machine
  Plays by Rob Penny vis Internet Archive Wayback Machine

1941 births
2003 deaths
20th-century American dramatists and playwrights
American male poets
African-American poets
Writers from Pittsburgh
University of Pittsburgh faculty
People from Opelika, Alabama
American male dramatists and playwrights
20th-century American poets
20th-century American male writers
20th-century African-American writers
21st-century African-American people
African-American male writers
Central Catholic High School (Pittsburgh) alumni